The D1 class were a class of diesel locomotives built by Commonwealth Engineering, Granville with English Electric traction equipment for Australian Iron & Steel's, Port Kembla steelworks in 1950-1951.

History
In May 1950, D1 became the first diesel to operate on an Australian main line. The eight D class locomotives hauled trains on Australian Iron & Steel's, Port Kembla until a downturn in the early 1980s saw most of the class withdrawn. D6 and D7 were reactivated with the former remaining in service until 2004.

Three have been preserved:
D1 by the NSW Rail Museum, Thirlmere.
D6 by the Lithgow State Mine Heritage Park & Railway, Lithgow. This unit is still stored in Port Kembla.
D7 by the former ARHS ACT Division, Canberra.

References

Railway Transportation, November 1951, 'D-E locos and 60-ton cars boost operations for AI&S'

BHP Billiton diesel locomotives
Bo-Bo locomotives
Commonwealth Engineering locomotives
Diesel locomotives of New South Wales
Railway locomotives introduced in 1950
Standard gauge locomotives of Australia
Diesel-electric locomotives of Australia
English Electric locomotives